Club de Fútbol Ribamontán al Mar is a football team based in Galizano, Ribamontán al Mar in the autonomous community of Cantabria. Founded in 1971, the team plays in Tercera División – Group 3. The club's home ground is Baceñuela, which has a capacity of 3,000 spectators.

History 
In the 2018-19 season the club appeared in Tercera División after a four-years break, spent in Regional leagues. This season the club managed to remain its place in Tercera División, Group 3 by finishing 11th.

Season to season

28 seasons in Tercera División

References

External links
 Futbolme.com profile 
 Profile on City Hall 

Football clubs in Cantabria
Association football clubs established in 1971
1971 establishments in Spain